South Carolina Highway 72 may refer to:

South Carolina Highway 72, a state highway from a point southwest of Calhoun Falls to Rock Hill
South Carolina Highway 72 (1920s–1930s), a former state highway from a point south of Waterloo to a point in Waterloo
South Carolina Highway 72 (1940s), a former state highway from a point near Leeds to a point in Leeds

072 (disambiguation)